The Bryce Commission may refer to:

 Royal Commission on Secondary Education, an 1895 Royal Commission headed by James Bryce, 1st Viscount Bryce
 Committee on Alleged German Outrages, a World War I commission also headed by Viscount Bryce 
 Royal Commission on Corporate Concentration, a 1975–1978 Canadian Royal Commission headed by Robert Broughton Bryce
 Bryce Commission (House of Lords reform) - A Commission in the United Kingdom which in 1918 reported on House of Lords reform